Garvo A. Lanete (born February 13, 1989) is a Filipino former professional basketball player. He previously played in the Philippine Basketball Association (PBA) for three teams.

College career
Lanete studied and played with San Beda Red Lions from 2007 to 2012. He led the Red Lions when they won 4 out of 5 championships. He played his last game with the Red Lions in their 57–55 win over the San Sebastian Stags.

Amateur career
Lanete played for the San Beda-Maynilad Water Dragons in the opener of the PBA D-League. When Maynilad was disbanded, he joined the NLEX Road Warriors and led the team to multiple titles.

He last played for the Hapee Fresh Fighters and was part of the Gilas Pilipinas training pool.

Professional career
Lanete was supposed to apply for the 2014 PBA draft but he decided to forgo the draft as he intended to train more and improve some of his weaknesses. After spending another year as a Gilas Cadet in the D-League, he applied for the 2015 Rookie draft, based on the list released by the PBA on August 10, 2015. He was drafted sixth overall by the NLEX Road Warriors in the 2015 PBA draft.

On December 29, 2021, he retired from basketball to migrate to the United States with his family.

PBA career statistics

Season-by-season averages
 
|-
| align=left | 
| align=left | NLEX
| 33 || 16.1 || .391 || .388 || .971 || 1.4 || .5 || .4 || .1 || 7.4
|-
| align=left | 
| align=left | NLEX / Meralco
| 40 || 21.4 || .330 || .298 || .881 || 1.9 || 1.3 || .5 || .4 || 6.6
|-
| align=left | 
| align=left | Meralco
| 31 || 12.1 || .396 || .346 || .833 || 1.1 || .5 || .2 || .1 || 4.8
|-
| align=left | 
| align="left" rowspan="3" | NorthPort
| 40 || 17.1 || .411 || .389 || .759 || 1.3 || .6 || .4 || .2 || 7.2
|-
| align=left | 
| 9 || 25.7 || .447 || .444 || .810 || 2.2 || 1.2 || .6 || .1 || 12.1
|-
| align=left | 
| 10 || 11.9 || .375 || .267 || .917 || 1.1 || .3 || .1 || .0 || 4.9
|-class="sortbottom"
| align=center colspan=2 | Career
| 163 || 17.4 || .392 || .356 || .862 || 1.5 || .7 || .4 || .2 || 7.2

Personal life
He has two brothers who are also basketball players, Von Harry (Bon Bon) and fellow PBA player Chico. His father was also a former professional basketball player.

References

1989 births
Living people
Basketball players from Leyte (province)
Competitors at the 2011 Southeast Asian Games
Competitors at the 2013 Southeast Asian Games
Filipino emigrants to the United States
Filipino men's basketball players
Meralco Bolts players
NLEX Road Warriors draft picks
NLEX Road Warriors players
NorthPort Batang Pier players
People from Ormoc
Philippines men's national basketball team players
Point guards
San Beda Red Lions basketball players
Shooting guards
Southeast Asian Games gold medalists for the Philippines
Southeast Asian Games medalists in basketball